Barrett Hofherr (formerly Barrett) is an independent advertising agency headquartered in San Francisco, California, and founded in December 2012.

The agency is led by Partner and Chief Strategist Matt Hofherr, Creative Directors Jamie Barrett and Todd Eisner, Head of People Molly Warner, Head of Strategy Amie Chan, and Head of Production Conor Duignan.

Barrett Hofherr is a two-time honoree in the Ad Age Small Agency Awards, and was named West Coast Small Agency of the Year in 2018.

Barrett Hofherr's clients include Activision/Blizzard, Chime, eBay, Meta, and World Market.

Prior to opening the agency, founder Jamie Barrett worked as a writer and creative director at agencies including Wieden + Kennedy, Goodby Silverstein & Partners, Fallon, and Chiat Day. He is a former Adweek National Creative Director of the Year and was named one of Creativity’s Top 50 creatives in 2006, 2007 and 2008.

Matt Hofherr joined Barrett Hofherr in March 2021 after founding MUH-TAY-ZIK | HOF-FER (M/H) in 2010. M/H was named Advertising Age Small Agency of the Year in 2014.

References

External links
Barrett Hofherr official website

Digital marketing companies of the United States
Companies based in San Francisco
Marketing companies established in 2012
Advertising agencies of the United States
2012 establishments in California